Estonia-Turkey relations are foreign relations between Estonia and Turkey. Estonia has an embassy in Ankara and Turkey has an embassy in Tallinn.

Official Visits

Economic Relations

Trade volume between the two countries was 312 million USD in 2018 (Turkish exports/imports: 92/220 million USD).

2,622 Turkish persons have applied for Estonia's e-residency, making Turkey 12th biggest country in the program. Turkey is the fourth country in the world by number of companies established by e-residents – 712.

61,707 Estonian tourists visited Turkey in 2018.

See also 

 Foreign relations of Estonia
 Foreign relations of Turkey
 EU–Turkey relations

References 

 
Turkey
Bilateral relations of Turkey